Soul Said Yes is the second studio project by singer Dara Tucker. It was released in 2011. It contains 14 songs, including two songs written by Tucker: "Partly Cloudy" and "The Space". Soul Said Yes features four songs with 7-string guitarist, Charlie Hunter: "Save Their Souls/Soul Said Yes", "The Space", "Stronger than Pride" and "I Will Move On Up a Little Higher". The album also features Greg Bryant (bass), Derrek Phillips (drums), James DaSilva (guitar), Reagan Mitchell (alto saxophone), Cord Martin (tenor saxophone), Chris West (soprano saxophone), Paul Horton (Fender Rhodes, piano) and Mason Embry (Fender Rhodes, piano).

Track listing
All That You Have Is Your Soul
Save Their Souls/Soul Said Yes
Tangerine
Easy to Love
Partly Cloudy
The Space
Body and Soul
Stronger than Pride
Poinciana
Pure Imagination
(Our) Love Is Here to Stay
I Will Move On Up a Little Higher
The Silence (Part 1)
Soul Says Yes

References

2011 albums
Jazz albums by American artists
Rhythm and blues albums by American artists